Neftekamsk Urban Okrug is an urban okrug in Republic of Bashkortostan, Russia. The administrative center is Neftekamsk.

References

Urban okrugs of Russia